The National Panhellenic Conference (NPC) is an umbrella organization for 26 (inter)national women's sororities throughout the United States and Canada. Each member group is autonomous as a social, Greek-letter society of college women and alumnae.

The National Panhellenic Conference provides guidelines and resources for its members and serves as the national voice on contemporary issues of sorority life. Founded in 1902, NPC is one of the oldest and largest women's membership organizations, representing more than 4 million women at over 650 college/university campuses and 4,600 local alumnae chapters in the U.S. and Canada. Each year, NPC-affiliated collegians and alumnae donate more than $5 million to causes, provide $2.8 million in scholarships to women, and volunteer 500,000 hours in their communities.

The organization holds a philosophy that it is a conference, not a congress, as it enacts no legislation and only regulates its own meetings. Other than basic agreements which its groups must unanimously vote to follow, NPC confines itself to recommendations and advice and acts as a court of final appeal in any College Panhellenic difficulty. One of its services is providing advisors for college and alumnae Panhellenic organizations.

History 
Early histories of women's fraternities contain accounts of "rushing and pledging agreements" or "compacts" among fraternities on various campuses, and many stories of cooperation and mutual assistance. However, no actual Panhellenic organization existed and no uniform practices were observed. These stories date all the way back to 1891 with the intention to meet again in 1893.

In 1902, Alpha Phi invited Pi Beta Phi, Kappa Alpha Theta, Kappa Kappa Gamma, Delta Gamma, Gamma Phi Beta, Delta Delta Delta, Alpha Chi Omega, and Chi Omega to a conference in Chicago on May 24 to set standards for collegiate sororities. Alpha Chi Omega and Chi Omega were unable to attend and would join the following year. The remaining seven groups met and the session resulted in the organization of the first interfraternity association and the first intergroup organization on college campuses. This meeting, and the next few, resulted in several mutual agreements, especially regarding pledging. Up to this time, no guidelines had been set, and women could be pledged to groups before enrolling in college and, indeed, even belong to more than one group.

Many of the current members joined through the next decade, with Alpha Xi Delta in 1904, Alpha Omicron Pi and Sigma Kappa in 1905, Alpha Delta Pi and Alpha Gamma Delta and Zeta Tau Alpha in 1909, Delta Zeta in 1910, Phi Mu in 1911, and Kappa Delta in 1912. No new members were admitted for the next few decades.

Throughout its early years, the NPC organizations were often racially and religiously segregated and rarely admitted Jewish, Catholic, or minority ethnic members, which led to the formation of group-specific sororities which attempted to provide the same social and academic outlets to groups who were otherwise excluded from membership. These groups included the first Black Greek letter organizations.

By 1922, the Conference (as of then still named the National Panhellenic Congress) had a structure of an executive committee consisting of a chairman, secretary, and treasurer; a publicity board; and a delegate board with at least one representative from each of its 18 senior members. That year, the Congress also began plans for its own centralized Panhellenic headquarters to coordinate and streamline interactions with the separate sororities.

Shortly before its merger with the NPC, the AES was part of a larger multi-panhellenic association, the Council of Affiliated Panhellenics. Created in 1941, it had the AES, NPC and the Professional Panhellenic Association as members.

AES merger and new memberships 
Members of Sigma Sigma Sigma and Alpha Sigma Alpha organized the Association of Pedagogical Sororities on July 10, 1915. The membership consisted of sororities which were primarily located on state campuses predominantly attended by women entering the educational field. In 1917, Pi Kappa Sigma and Delta Sigma Epsilon joined the association, followed by Theta Sigma Upsilon in 1925, Alpha Sigma Tau in 1926, and Pi Delta Theta in 1931. At the third biennial conference, the name of the association was changed to the Association of Educational Sororities (AES). Later, the word "Educational" was changed to "Education".

From 1915 through 1926, the NPC and AES operated chapters in the same colleges and universities. In 1926, the NPC and AES made an agreement "defining fields of activities of each panhellenic". There was competition between NPC and AES sororities, and dual memberships were often held. By the 1940s, however, many teacher's colleges had begun to add liberal arts programs, and vice versa, which led to difficulties in functioning separately as they had had in the past.

On November 12, 1947, at a conference in Colorado Springs, Colorado, the NPC considered and granted associate membership "with reservations" to the six AES sororities. The AES was holding its biennial meeting when it was notified of the NPC decision and, at that meeting, "completed the necessary business and took formal action to dissolve the Association of Education Sororities". The NPC admitted five other sororities at that same time: Alpha Epsilon Phi, Delta Phi Epsilon, Phi Sigma Sigma, Sigma Delta Tau, and Theta Phi Alpha. In December 1951, all 11 of these sororities became full members of NPC. Since that time, three AES members have merged with other NPC groups, leaving Alpha Sigma Alpha, Alpha Sigma Tau, and Sigma Sigma Sigma as the remaining former AES members.

From the 1940s to the 1960s, various smaller organizations merged into larger ones. On some campuses with two different chapters from the sorority that merged and its merger sorority, a third sorority would colonize on that campus to absorb the smaller sorority's former chapter.

By the end of the 1960s and the Civil rights movement, the NPC sororities eliminated official policies that prevented minority members from joining, although diversity in Greek life would remain an issue.

21st century 
As of the 2010s, sorority members and outside observers noticed a shift in sorority culture; though sororities began as feminist organizations, emphasis during the mid-1900s on social reputations and exclusionary recruitment policies (such as refusal to bid Jewish and African-American women) had led to a reputation for following cultural hegemony and of being made up of traditionally white and upper-class women. Though such issues continue to persist in various ways, sorority women and anti-sorority women alike observed more ethnic diversity and movement away from traditional power structures, back towards their organizations' feminist roots. In this decade, sorority members began attempts to change how Greek life works from inside their own organizations.

In November 2015, eight of the NPC members (Alpha Phi, Alpha Chi Omega, Phi Mu, Alpha Gamma Delta, Sigma Delta Tau, Delta Phi Epsilon, Delta Gamma, and Gamma Phi Beta) broke ranks from the NPC to withdraw support from the Safe Campus Act, a controversial bill that would have required campus sexual assault victims to report to police and submit to an investigation from law enforcement before their school would be able to begin any investigations of their own.

Beginning in 2016, collegiate members began discussing membership offers for transgender women, which was supported by some national organizations with changes in their national policies; however, some national organizations delayed membership offers for transwomen due to fears about Title IX exemption status, which caused dissent in local chapters. Though the NPC created a Gender Identity Study Group to examine potential legal consequences, they concluded that legal precedents were "incomplete, inconclusive, and inconsistent," and did not enact official policy or recommendations.

By 2021, most national organizations had released political statements on racial and social equity and inclusion, while also developing membership policies regarding gender identity. Delta Phi Epsilon developed a policy explicitly open to trans and non-binary individuals, and sororities open to any individual who identifies as a woman include: Alpha Chi Omega, Alpha Delta Pi, Alpha Epsilon Phi, Alpha Sigma Tau, Chi Omega,  Delta Gamma, Gamma Phi Beta, Kappa Alpha Theta, Kappa Delta, Kappa Kappa Gamma,Phi Sigma Sigma, Sigma Sigma Sigma, and Theta Phi Alpha. Sororities open to any individual who identifies and lives as a woman include: Alpha Gamma Delta, Alpha Omicron Pi, Alpha Xi Delta, Delta Delta Delta, Pi Beta Phi, Sigma Delta Tau, and Sigma Kappa, while Zeta Tau Alpha specifies that the individual must "consistently" identify and live as a woman.

The Council

The Panhellenic Council consists of executive board members at each university or college. Each institution holds different executive positions based on the size of the institution and the NPC relationship with the institution as well. The basic positions that are at each institution are President, VP of Communications, VP of Finance, VP of Philanthropy and Community Service, VP of Programming, VP of Recruitment, VP of Scholarship, and VP of Judicial. The number of positions is based on the number of NPC sororities that are at each institution. Along with the delegates each being a representative from their sorority, the executive board is filled with a member from each sorority as well.

Affiliate Organizations

Current members

Former Members

NPC Chairmen
Chairmen of the NPC. As of 2018 the NPC Board of Directors voted to change its governance model. Now, members rotate onto the board in the order their organization joined the NPC as has been their practice, but the chairman is now elected.

See also 

 List of social fraternities and sororities

References 

 
Student organizations established in 1902
Student societies in the United States
1902 establishments in Illinois
Greek letter umbrella organizations
Women's organizations based in the United States